The 2015–16 B Group was the 61st season of the Bulgarian B Football Group, the second tier of the Bulgarian football league system.

A total of 16 teams contested the league: 10 of which returning from the 2014–15 season, 4 of which promoted from third division and two new teams - the reserves team of Ludogorets Razgrad and Litex Lovech.

This season was different compared to previous seasons in terms of promotion. Since the league structure was changed for the first and second tiers, as well as the licensing criteria needed for teams entering the First League, a select number of teams were promoted administratively to the First League, without consideration of their league positions, which was reflected in the league table.

Stadia and locations

League table

Results

Promotion play-offs

Season statistics

Top scorers

Updated on 1 June 2016

Hat-tricks

References 

2015-16
Bul
2